The Olympic Training Center Velodrome, also known as the 7-11 Velodrome, is a velodrome in Colorado Springs, Colorado.

The track is surfaced with concrete, which is unusual as Olympic-quality tracks tend to be timber or synthetics.

In September 1984, the velodrome hosted the United States Cycling Federation Veteran's National Track Championships.

The velodrome was the site of the track competition of the World Cycling Championships in 1986. The competition took place from 27 August to 1 September that year and marked the first time the World Championships was held in the US.

Evelyn Stevens set the UCI women's hour record on the track in February 2016.

In June 2014, a masters champion, Victor Williams, died after a crash during a race at the Velodrome.

References

External links
 

Velodromes in the United States
Sports venues in Colorado Springs, Colorado